Asura nigriciliata is a moth of the family Erebidae. It is found on the Sangihe Islands.

References

nigriciliata
Moths described in 1900
Moths of Indonesia